The Turn of the Screw is a novella by Henry James.

(The) Turn of the Screw(s) may also refer to:

Film
 The Turn of the Screw (1974 film), a film by Dan Curtis
 The Turn of the Screw (2009 film), a film by Tim Fywell
 The Turn of the Screw (1982 film), a film by Petr Weigl, starring Magdaléna Vášáryová
 The Turn of the Screw (1990 film), a film by Graeme Clifford
 The Turn of the Screw (1992 film), a film by Rusty Lemorande
 The Turn of the Screw (2020 film), a film by Alex Galvin

Music
 Turn of the Screw (album), an album by 1208
 'Turn of the Screw, a 1989 album by Dirty Looks
 "The Turn of the Screw", a 2009 song by Heaven and Hell from The Devil You Know

Stage
 The Turn of the Screw (opera), an opera by Benjamin Britten
The Turn of the Screw, a 1980 ballet score by Luigi Zaninelli
The Turn of the Screw, a 1996 stage play adaptation by Jeffrey Hatcher
The Turn of the Screw, a 2013 stage play adaptation by Rebecca Lenkiewicz

Television
 The Turn of the Screw (Ford Startime), a 1959 adaptation for Ford Startime, directed by John Frankenheimer.
 The Turn of the Screw (1999 film), a British television film adaptation starring Jodhi May
 "Turn of the Screws", an episode of CSI: Crime Scene Investigation
 "Turn of the Screw", an episode of Blade: The Series